Aequorivita echinoideorum is a Gram-negative, rod-shaped and aerobic bacterium from the genus of Aequorivita which has been isolated from a sea urchin (Tripneustes gratilla) from Penghu Island in Taiwan.

References 

Flavobacteria
Bacteria described in 2015